Radio Subotica is a radio station, broadcasting from Subotica, Vojvodina, Serbia. It was founded on 29 November 1968. It broadcasts program on 3 languages: Serbian, Croatian and Hungarian.

References 

Subotica
Mass media in Subotica
Subotica
Subotica
Subotica